George Fernie (18 October 1860 – 27 August 1915) was a Scottish professional golfer who played in the late 19th century. Fernie had five starts in the Open Championship, the best of which was seventh place in the 1884 Open Championship.

Early life
Fernie was born in St Andrews, Fife, Scotland on 18 October 1860.

Golf career

1884 Open Championship
The 1884 Open Championship was held 3 October at Prestwick Golf Club in Prestwick, South Ayrshire, Scotland. Jack Simpson won the Championship by four strokes, ahead of runners-up Willie Fernie and Douglas Rolland.

Details of play
This was the first Open Championship to be played at Prestwick after it had been extended from 12 to 18 holes in 1882. The contest was still over 36 holes but  consisted of two 18-hole rounds rather than three 12-hole rounds. Conditions were difficult with a strong wind. Simpson, one of the early starters, had the best score in both rounds and was the surprise winner. Fernie and Rolland were joint second and shared the second and third prizes.

Death
Fernie died on 27 August 1915 in Troon, Ayrshire, Scotland.

Results in The Open Championship

Note: Fernie played only in The Open Championship.

DNP = Did not play
"T" indicates a tie for a place
Yellow background for top-10

References

Scottish male golfers
Golfers from St Andrews
1860 births
1915 deaths